Robert Higgs (born 1 February 1944) is an American economic historian and economist combining material from Public Choice, the New institutional economics, and the Austrian school of economics; and describes himself as a "libertarian anarchist" in political and legal theory and public policy. His writings in economics and economic history have most often focused on the causes, means, and effects of government power and growth.

Academic career
Higgs earned a Ph.D. in Economics from the Johns Hopkins University and has held teaching positions at the University of Washington, Lafayette College, and Seattle University. He has also been a visiting scholar at Oxford University and Stanford University. He held a visiting professorship at the University of Economics, Prague in 2006, and has supervised dissertations in the Ph.D. program at Universidad Francisco Marroquín, where he is currently an honorary professor of economics and history.

Higgs has been a Senior Fellow in Political Economy at the Independent Institute since September 1994. He has served at Editor at Large of The Independent Review since 2013, after having been Editor from 1995 to 2013.

Writings

The Ratchet effect
In his ''Crisis and Leviathan'', Higgs first elaborated in detail on his ratchet hypothesis as part of a more general interpretation of governmental growth. Higgs aimed to demonstrate that contemporary models to explain the growth of government did not explain why growth historically occurred in spurts, rather than continuously.. Higgs formulated the ratchet effect to explain this phenomenon. He theorized that most government growth occurred in response to real or imagined national "crises" and that after the crises, some, but rarely all, of the new interventions ceased. ''Crisis and Leviathan'' surveys the history of the American federal government from the 1880s to the 1980s, applying the ratchet effect to the period. He cites economic crises and wars as the chief sources for the growth of government.

Daniel McCarthy praised Higgs and summarized his ratchet effect theory in a review of Against Leviathan that appeared in The American Conservative. In the review, McCarthy remarked that
What made Crisis and Leviathan a milestone was the rigor with which it elaborated upon the logic of James Madison's 1794 warning against "the old trick of turning every contingency into a resource for accumulating force in government." Other political economists had studied the growth of state power during times of war, depression, and general upheaval before, but none had done so as thoughtfully and thoroughly as Higgs. He took special care in describing the "ratchet effect" – once a crisis has passed state power usually recedes again, but it rarely returns to its original levels; thus each emergency leaves the scope of government at least a little wider than before.

Foreign policy
During the 2008 presidential election, Higgs defended then-presidential candidate Ron Paul in response to Bret Stephens's article from The Wall Street Journal and made the case why "war, preparation for war, and foreign military interventions have served for the most part not to protect us, as we are constantly told, but rather to sap our economic vitality and undermine our civil and economic liberties."

Bibliography

Books authored
 The Transformation of the American Economy, 1865–1914 (1971)
 Competition and Coercion: Blacks in the American Economy, 1865–1914 (1977)
 Crisis and Leviathan: Critical Episodes in the Growth of American Government (1987)
 Against Leviathan: Government Power and a Free Society (2004)
 Resurgence of the Warfare State: The Crisis Since 9/11 (2005)
 Depression, War and Cold War: Studies in Political Economy (2006)
 Politická ekonomie strachu ("The Political Economy of Fear") (Czech language; 2006)
 Neither Liberty Nor Safety: Fear, Ideology, and the Growth of Government (2007)
 Delusions of Power: New Explorations of the State, War, and Economy (2012)
 Taking a Stand: Reflections on Life, Liberty, and the Economy (2015)

Books edited
 Emergence of the Modern Political Economy (1985)
 Arms, Politics, and the Economy: Historical and Contemporary Perspectives (1990)
 Hazardous to Our Health? FDA Regulation of Health Care Products (1995)
 Re-Thinking Green: Alternatives to Environmental Bureaucracy with Carl P. Close (2005)
 The Challenge of Liberty: Classical Liberalism Today with Carl P. Close (2006)
 Opposing the Crusader State: Alternatives to Global Interventionism with Carl P. Close (2007)

Book contributions
 "War Can Rarely be Justified." War. Detroit: Greenhaven Press, 2014, pp. 27–36. .
 Second Thoughts: Myths and Morals of U.S. Economic History, edited by David M. McClosky. New York: Oxford University Press, 1993. .

Notes

External links

 Biography at Independent Institute
 Liberty and Power Group Blog
 Works by Higgs at LewRockwell.com
 Works by Higgs at the Ludwig von Mises Institute
 Higgs, Robert. "The War in Iraq: 1,760 Days and Counting." Los Angeles Chronicle, February 5, 2008.
 Roberts, Russ. "Higgs on the Great Depression." EconTalk (December 15, 2008). Library of Economics and Liberty.
 Gordon, David. "The State Eviscerated." Review of Against Leviathan: Government Power and a Free Society by Robert Higgs. The Mises Review, Vol. 10, No. 4 (Winter 2004).
 

1944 births
Living people
20th-century American economists
20th-century American male writers
20th-century American non-fiction writers
21st-century American economists
21st-century American male writers
21st-century American non-fiction writers
American anarcho-capitalists
American columnists
American economics writers
American libertarians
American male non-fiction writers
American political philosophers
American political writers
Austrian School economists
Cato Institute people
Johns Hopkins University alumni
Lafayette College faculty
Libertarian economists
Libertarian historians
Libertarian theorists
Mises Institute people
Non-interventionism
Seattle University faculty